William Wolbert (1883–1918) was an American actor and film director of the silent era. He directed for Vitagraph and Universal Pictures before his career was cut short by his death.

Selected filmography

Actor
 The Burned Hand (1915)
 The Dumb Girl of Portici (1916)

Director
 Aladdin from Broadway (1917)
 The Divorcee (1917)
 The Flaming Omen (1917)
 Captain of the Gray Horse Troop (1917)
 The Magnificent Meddler (1917)
 When Men Are Tempted (1917)
 Sunlight's Last Raid (1917)
 Money Magic (1917)
 By Right of Possession (1917)
 That Devil, Bateese (1918)
 The Light of Victory (1919)

References

Bibliography
Ken Wlaschin. Silent Mystery and Detective Movies: A Comprehensive Filmography. McFarland, 2009.

External links

1883 births
1918 deaths
American male film actors
American film directors
People from Petersburg, Virginia